Donovan Olson (born June 12, 1965) is a former Iowa State Representative from the 48th District. A Democrat, he served in the Iowa House of Representatives from 2003 until 2011, when he lost re-election to Republican Chip Baltimore.  He received his BA and MCRP from Iowa State University.

During his last term in the Iowa House, Olson served on the Commerce, Joint Government Oversight, Local Government, Transportationm, and Ways and Means committees.  He also served as chair of the Environmental Protection Committee and as a member of the Agriculture and Natural Resources Appropriations Subcommittee and of the Climate Change Advisory Council.

Electoral history
*incumbent

References

External links

 Representative Donovan Olson official Iowa General Assembly site
Donovan Olson State Representative official constituency site
 

Living people
Democratic Party members of the Iowa House of Representatives
Iowa State University alumni
1965 births
People from Boone, Iowa